Pithecopus is a genus of frogs in the subfamily Phyllomedusinae. Species of the genus Pithecopus are found in tropical South America east of the Andes, from southern Venezuela to northern Argentina. Resurrected from the synonymy of Phyllomedusa in 2016, it corresponds to the former Phyllomedusa hypochondrialis group. Its sister group is Callimedusa.

Etymology
The name of this genus is derived from the Greek pithekodes, which means "ape-like".

Description
Toe I is much longer than toe II, and is opposable to it. No vomerine teeth are present. The tadpoles have a moderately small oral disc that is anteroventrally directed.

Species
There are 12 species in this genus:

The AmphibiaWeb lists only two species (Pithecopus araguaius and Pithecopus gonzagai), the rest being included in Phyllomedusa.

References

Phyllomedusinae
 
Amphibian genera
Frogs of South America
Taxa named by Edward Drinker Cope